Darren Strong (born 4 July 1985) is a Gaelic footballer from County Laois.

References

1985 births
Living people
Emo Gaelic footballers
Laois inter-county Gaelic footballers